The white Amur bream (Parabramis pekinensis) is a species of cyprinid freshwater fish, of the monotypic genus  Parabramis. It is an important food fish, and has been introduced to regions outside its native range.

The species was originally described as Abramis pekinensis.  The name is derived from the Greek word para, meaning "the side of ", and the Old French word breme, a type of freshwater fish.

References

Cultrinae
Cyprinid fish of Asia
Freshwater fish of China
Monotypic fish genera
Fish described in 1855